Lintley Halt is a railway station on the South Tynedale Railway, which runs between Slaggyford and Alston.

History
The station opened in April 2012, as part of the South Tynedale Railway, a narrow-gauge heritage railway in Cumbria and Northumberland. It was officially opened by Lord Inglewood in May 2012.

The station is located on the alignment of the former Alston Line, which ran from Haltwhistle to Alston, until the line's closure by the British Railways Board in May 1976. However, unlike stations at Alston and Slaggyford, Lintley Halt was not part of the original line, instead being purpose-built for the heritage railway.

The South Tynedale Railway was extended from Lintley Hall to Slaggyford in June 2018, reopening the station following a 42-year closure.

It is the eventual aim of the South Tynedale Railway for the narrow-gauge railway to serve the length of the former Alston Line, restoring the rail link between Haltwhistle and Alston.

See also
 Slaggyford
 South Tynedale Railway

References

External links
 

Railway stations in Northumberland
2012 establishments in England
Railway stations in Great Britain opened in 2012
Railway stations built for UK heritage railways